Hostage diplomacy, also hostage-diplomacy, is the taking of hostages for diplomatic purposes.

Background and overview

The custom of taking hostages was an integral part of foreign relations in the ancient world. This long history of political and military use indicates that political authorities or generals would legally agree to hand over one or usually several hostages in the custody of the other side, as guarantee of good faith in the observance of obligations. These obligations would be in the form of signing of a peace treaty, in the hands of the victor, or even exchange hostages as mutual assurance in cases such as an armistice.

In ancient China, during the period of Eastern Zhou, vassal states would exchange hostages to ensure mutual trust. Such a hostage was known as zhìzǐ (質子, "hostage son"), who was usually a prince of the ruling house. During the Han dynasty, taking unilateral hostages consisting of zhìzǐ was a standard practice for the centralized monarchy to control smaller yí states.

Some Chinese classic texts, however, were against the hostage system. On the famous exchange of hostages between Zhou and Zheng (周鄭交質), the Zuo zhuan criticized the incidence:

The Romans were also accustomed to take the sons of tributary princes and educate them at Rome, thus holding a security for the continued loyalty of the conquered nation and also instilling a possible future ruler with Roman ideologies. This practice was also adopted in the early period of the British occupation of India, and by France in relations with Arab nations in North Africa.

In contemporary times, hostage diplomacy is the taking of hostages for diplomatic purposes. It has a negative connotation, associated with criminal hostage-taking, and often manifests as foreigners being arrested on trumped-up charges. The diplomatic hostages are then held as bargaining chips.

Modern examples

China
According to The Guardian, China has a track record of hostage diplomacy but has repeatedly denied engaging in the practice. From 1967 to 1969, the Chinese Communist Party kept two dozen British diplomats and civilians as de facto hostages. The British were able to effect the release of their personnel by decoupling the hostage situation from broader political and economic issues through protracted negotiation.

It is widely believed that China detained two Canadians, Michael Spavor and Michael Kovrig, in response to the arrest of Meng Wanzhou. In 2019, Australian Yang Hengjun's detention was also linked to a renewed effort at hostage diplomacy in response to the arrest of Meng Wanzhou. Prior to Hengjun's detention, the Australian government had sharply criticized the Chinese government for detaining the two Canadians. The 2020 arrest of the Australian news anchor Cheng Lei has been viewed as a possible incidence of hostage diplomacy. The February 2019 exit ban placed on Irish citizen Richard O'Halloran has also been considered a case of hostage diplomacy.

The Lowy Institute has concluded that China's use of hostage diplomacy, among other things, undermines their "peaceful rise" narrative. The Taiwanese government has expressed concerns that the Hong Kong national security law will be used to facilitate further Chinese hostage diplomacy. According to Taiwan News in 2020 China began practicing hostage diplomacy towards Taiwan, a target against which it hadn't been used for some time.

On 15 February 2021, 58 countries including Japan, Australia, the United Kingdom, and the United States formed a coalition led by Canada, signed a non-binding declaration, and condemned the arbitrary detention of foreign nationals for diplomatic leverage. While China was not officially called out, Canadian and American officials said that China had been the subject of the statement. The Canadian foreign ministry said it was not targeting a single nation but was bringing diplomatic pressure on the issue. Shortly after, China's embassy in Canada released an article published by the Chinese Communist Party-owned tabloid Global Times, which dismissed the coalition's efforts as an "aggressive and ill-considered attack designed to provoke China".

In September 2021, following the release of Meng Wanzhou, the two Canadians held in China as well as two Americans held in China whose detentions were suspected of being linked to hostage diplomacy over Meng Wanzhou's court case were freed.

China is also known to have detained American citizens including Mark Swidan, Alice Lin, and Kai Li. The detentions of Swidan and Li have been ruled arbitrary by an independent group of human rights experts at the United Nations Working Group on Arbitrary Detention.

Turkey
According to Eric Edelman and Aykan Erdemir of the Foundation for Defense of Democracies, hostage diplomacy has been widely used by Turkish President Recep Tayyip Erdoğan. The case of Andrew Brunson, an American pastor working in Turkey imprisoned in 2016, has been widely referred to as a case of diplomatic hostage taking.

Iran

Modern Iranian hostage diplomacy began soon after the Iranian revolution with the Iran hostage crisis.

Iran's government has used hostage diplomacy as a key diplomatic tool. Hostages have included, Nazanin Zaghari-Ratcliffe, Jolie King, Kylie Moore-Gilbert, Morad Tahbaz, Kamal Foroughi, Aras Amiri, Kameel Ahmady, and Anousheh Ashouri.

In late-September, 2019, when questioned about the Zaghari-Ratcliffe case, Iranian President Hassan Rouhani compared the imprisonment of foreigners in Iran to the imprisonment of Iranians in Western countries—saying that leaders on both sides were denying power over the decisions of their own judiciary, and that "we must all" exert "a constant, concerted effort... so... all prisoners must be free... but it must be a path that travels both ways."

As of 2022 Iran held 20 to 40 foreigners.

North Korea

North Korea has made wide use of hostage diplomacy as a tool against the US, South Korea, Japan, Malaysia and various European nations. Those held hostage are often tourists or exchange students who are either charged with minor offenses or espionage. In recent years it has been speculated that the regime of Kim Jong-un had evolved from using hostages to gain leverage to using hostages as human shields to protect against a feared American intervention. The case of Otto Warmbier, which ended in Warmbier's death soon after his release, is a particularly well known example of North Korean hostage diplomacy.

Russia

Russia has been accused of hostage diplomacy in the cases of Paul Whelan and Brittney Griner, and has exchanged prisoners with the United States in the past.

See also
 Economic diplomacy
 Full spectrum diplomacy
 Gunboat diplomacy 
 Soft power
 Hard power
 List of Chinese spy cases in the United States

References

Diplomacy
Hostage taking
Types of diplomacy